Helmut Uhlig (11 November 1942 – 22 July 2014) was a German basketball player. He competed in the men's tournament at the 1972 Summer Olympics.

References

1942 births
2014 deaths
German men's basketball players
Olympic basketball players of West Germany
Basketball players at the 1972 Summer Olympics
Sportspeople from Halle (Saale)